Below is list of Estonian language exonyms for places in non-Estonian-speaking countries:

Algeria

Denmark

Finland

France

Germany

Greece

Italy

Latvia

Poland

Portugal

Romania

Russia

Serbia

Sweden

See also
List of European exonyms

References
EKI KNAB

Estonian language
Lists of exonyms